The 1919–20 season was the twenty-fifth season in which Dundee competed at a Scottish national level, playing in Division One, and their first since 1916–17, after being asked by the Scottish Football League to leave due to travel difficulties imposed by World War I. In the interim, Dundee has competed in the Eastern Football League, before being readmitted after the war in 1919. Their return to the national level would be under a new manager in former long-time player Sandy MacFarlane, following the resignation of William Wallace in 1919 due to health reasons. They would finish in 4th place, their highest finish since 1908–09. Dundee would also compete in the Scottish Cup for the first time since its restart, and were knocked out in the 2nd round by Celtic.

Scottish Division One 

Statistics provided by Dee Archive.

League table

Scottish Cup 

Statistics provided by Dee Archive.

Player Statistics 
Statistics provided by Dee Archive

|}

See also 

 List of Dundee F.C. seasons

References

External links 

 1919-20 Dundee season on Fitbastats

Dundee F.C. seasons
Dundee